House Full is a 2009 Indian Kannada-language film directed by Hemanth Hegde , starring Diganth, Vishakha Singh, Hemanth Hegde and Girija Oak in lead roles.

Cast

 Diganth as Digu
 Vishakha Singh as Ishu
 Girija Oak as Neethu
 Hemanth Hegde as Parameshi
 Loknath
 Milind Gunaji
 Bullet Prakash 
 Ramesh Bhat
 Sangamesh Upase
 Srinivas Gowda

Music

Reception

Critical response 

R G Vijayasarathy of Rediff.com scored the film at 3 out of 5 stars and says "Diganth with his dimpled looks is much better than his comedy role in Masth Maja Maadi. Mumbai girls Vishaka Singh and Gowri are okay -- their confused expressions are effectively shown. It is veteran actor Uncle Lokanath who has really done a great job as Balawanta Rao. Kiran's music could have been better but the songs are well picturised. All in all, House Full is an enjoyable fare". A critic from The New Indian Express wrote "Meanwhile, Diganth’s grandfather comes to Bangalore. He mistakes Neethu as Ishwarya. He even arranges a honeymoon for them at Goa. But Ishwarya appears on the scene and wants to be with Diganth. The climax is how Parameshi and his wife Neethu come together again. It provides some entertainment, if that is all you are looking for". BS Srivani from Deccan Herald wrote "Girija impresses while Vishakha fails even to provide an eyeful. Bullet Prakash, Rekha, Milind Gunaji, Myna and Jhansi Subbaiah are wasted. Digant, however, is the actual heroine of the film, with his killing looks and penchant for falling into trouble just as easily as any newbie heroine is prone to do. His voice doesn’t help either". A critic from Bangalore Mirror wrote  "Though the film is silly most of the time, it still manages to make you laugh. Girija Oak is the best among all the actors. Diganth is still to attend acting school, he better do it before his next assignment. The film is worth a travel to the cinema hall".

References

External links 
Rediff article

2000s Kannada-language films
2009 films